St. David's Episcopal Church, also known as St. David's  at Radnor or Old St. David's, is a parish of the Episcopal Church located at 763 South Valley Forge Road in Radnor Township, Pennsylvania. The church property contains the original church built in 1715, a chapel, church offices, school and cemetery. The property straddles the borders of Radnor Township and Newtown Township in Delaware County and the majority of the cemetery is in Easttown Township, Chester County. It was founded c. 1700 in the Welsh Tract section of the Province of Pennsylvania by Welsh settlers and has grown to be the largest congregation in the Episcopal Diocese of Pennsylvania with approximately 3,000 members. The original church and cemetery were placed on the National Register of Historic Places in 1978.

History

Founding
After the establishment of the Welsh Tract in the colony of Pennsylvania, the area was settled by numerous emigrants from Wales, particularly Welsh Quakers, although Welsh people of other faiths, drawn by Pennsylvania's religious toleration and the opportunity to conduct their affairs in their own language, settled the area as well.  In those days, life on the frontier saw exercise of religious beliefs in a limited way (frequently without houses of worship or clergy), which became a concern to many.  The Society for the Propagation of the Gospel in Foreign Parts, in London, sent the Welsh Anglican Rev. Evan Evans to the area as a circuit missionary.  He began holding fortnightly services in private houses, including that of William Davis in the area known as Radnor, in the southern part of the Welsh Tract, starting November, 1700. The first mention of a church is in 1700 with historical records mentioning a church made of logs at the location of the current old stone church which was intended to also be used as a shelter against potential attacks from native Americans.

In 1708, John Oldmixon in his book The British Empire in America noted that

After Rev. Evans' departure, the Welsh-speaking Anglicans of Radnor sent the Society a 100-signature petition requesting a shipment of Welsh-language prayer books and Bibles, and especially requesting another Welsh-speaking missionary.  A complete response was apparently slow in coming; ten years later, upon meeting their new leader, the parishioners "heartily engaged themselves to build a handsome stone church to be named after the Patron Saint of Wales".  The cornerstone of the new building was laid on May 9, 1715.  In an unusual expression of solidarity between denominations, several other clergymen assisted with the laying of the foundation, including Pastor Sandel of Old Swedes Church in Philadelphia. A floor was not added to the church until 1765. The building still stands, and seats 100 in old-fashioned box pews; the current organ is not original, having been built in 1952.

An early pastor, the Rev. John Clubb, who served from about 1707 to 1715, and later the Rev. Robert Weyman, who served during the 1720s, were paid by the Society for the Propagation of the Gospel in Foreign Parts and shared duties between St. David's and Old Trinity Church, located about 20 miles to the east in Oxford.

Revolutionary and Federal periods
With the coming of the American Revolution in the colonies, a wave of resentment against the Church of England (which professed loyalty to the king) arose among the congregation.  A leader of this opposition was Anthony Wayne, a lifelong member of St. David's who was later appointed major general of the American forces.  The rector, the Rev. William Currie, bound by his oath of duty to the king, resigned his position, which remained officially vacant for 12 years (Rev. Currie performed marriages, baptisms, and the like privately until at least 1783).  During the war, no services were held in the church. The church building provided shelter for soldiers of both sides and Continental Army soldiers cut the lead out of the windows of the church to use as bullets. After the nearby Battle of Brandywine, sixteen British soldiers were buried in the cemetery at St. David's.

While St. David's left the organization of the Church of England, it remained in the Anglican Communion, and the church was represented at the first General Convention of the Protestant Episcopal Church of the United States in 1784, after the peace treaty was signed.

The church was formally incorporated and chartered in August 1792.  A church school was organized in 1820.  The first confirmation services were conducted by Bishop William White, who became the first Presiding Bishop.  The first physical addition to the church holdings was the fieldstone "Old Rectory" in 1844.

Suburbanization

After the construction of the "main line" of the Pennsylvania Railroad in 1832, the once-isolated community began to evolve more rapidly, particularly after the railroad built local stations and offered frequent train service in the Philadelphia area.  One of the way stations on the Main Line was named St. Davids for the church (the station is approximately 3 miles/4 km from the church), and a community of the same name grew up around the station.  The community has no post office of its own, and is served by the nearby Wayne post office.  As Philadelphians began to live outside the city in the late 19th century, the church's parishioners became more suburban.

As the congregation grew, the parish expanded accordingly.  A parish house (office building), with church school facilities, was built in 1924 and enlarged in 1950.  Further growth of the congregation led to heated discussion over whether the parish should accommodate a burgeoning membership or retain its early character; this was resolved by the 1956 construction of a new worship building, several times the size of the original church.

On October 13, 1947, a Pennsylvania Historical Marker was placed at St. David's Church to recognize the historical importance of the site. The old church built in 1715 and cemetery were placed on the National Register of Historic Places on September 20, 1978.

A separate building was built for Sunday school classes in 1965, the year the parish celebrated its 250th anniversary at a service attended by the Bishop of St David's in Wales.  The building is named the Knewstub Building for a former rector of the parish.

Continued growth of the congregation rendered the chapel too small by the time it was 50 years old.  A new, larger chapel, seating 650, was constructed adjacent to the old one in 2006.  A three-manual, 48-stop, mechanical action organ was installed in 2007.  The old chapel, its pews, etc., removed, is now named St. David's Hall, hosting receptions after services and other church-related activities, and serving as a connector between the new chapel and the parish offices.

The church grounds lie at the intersection of three townships and two counties.  The old church building, along with a small portion of the graveyard, is located in Newtown Township, Delaware County; the chapel and offices are located in Radnor Township, Delaware County; and most of the graveyard is in Easttown Township, Chester County.

Longfellow poem

In March 1880, the poet Henry Wadsworth Longfellow visited St. David's.  Struck by the peace and quiet of "this little church among its graves", he composed a poem about it: "Old St. David's at Radnor", which was published later that same year in the collection Ultima Thule.  The poem refers to another poet, Welshman George Herbert, and the small Bemerton church of which he was rector.

Historic Structures

The "old" church building, constructed 1715, was added to or modified a number of times, in 1767, 1771, 1786, 1813, 1830, and 1907.  These modifications included the relocation of the altar, the addition of an enclosed stair to the choir loft, the addition of a vestry room to the north, and the construction of an enclosure for the main entry door.  A horse shed was built in 1850, and added to in 1871.  The horse shed has since been demolished.

These structures were recorded in the Historic American Buildings Survey.  Numerous photographs were also taken.

Graveyard

Notable burials at St. David's include:
 William W. Atterbury (1866–1935), Brigadier General in World War I, and President of the Pennsylvania Railroad 1925–35
 Rose Bampton (1907–2007), opera singer
 George W. Pepper (1867–1961), U.S. Senator 1922–27
 V. Gilpin Robinson (1851–1942), Pennsylvania State Representative for Delaware County, 1911–13
 Helen Hope Montgomery Scott (1904–1995), Socialite and philanthropist
 Edward Lowber Stokes (1880–1964), US Congressman
 Anthony Wayne (1745–1796), Continental Army Brigadier general during the American Revolution
 Isaac Wayne (1699–1774), member of the Pennsylvania Provincial Assembly
 Isaac Wayne (1772–1852) U.S. Representative from Pennsylvania, 1823–25
 R. Norris Williams (1891–1968), professional tennis player and Olympic athlete

The grave of American Revolutionary War General Anthony Wayne at St. David's is one of his two graves. He died during a return trip to Pennsylvania from a military post in Detroit.  He was initially buried at Fort Presque Isle, Pennsylvania. His son, Isaac Wayne, disinterred the body in 1809 and had the corpse boiled to remove the flesh from the bones. The remaining flesh was reburied at Fort Presque Isle and the bones were placed into two saddlebags and relocated to the family plot in the St. David's graveyard. On June 5, 1811, The Pennsylvania State Society of the Cincinnati placed a monument in the cemetery to the memory of Anthony Wayne over the grave containing his bones.

Rectors
The missionaries (to 1714) and rectors (thereafter) of St. David's, with their years of service:
 Evan Evans, D.D., 1700–1704
 John Clubb, ca. 1707–, 1714–1715
 Evan Evans, D.D., 1716–1718
 John Humphreys, 1718–1719
 Robert Weyman, 1719–1730
 Richard Backhouse, 1730–1732
 Griffith Hughes, 1732–1736
 William Currie 1737–1776 (officially), 1776–1785 (unofficially)
 Slator Clay, 1786–1821
 Samuel Crawford Brinckle, 1818–1832
 Simon Wilmer, 1832–1833
 William Henry Rees, D.D., 1833–1838
 Willie Peck, 1838–1845
 Breed Batcheller, 1845–1847
 Thomas Greene Allen, 1847–1848
 John Albemarle Childs, D.D., 1848–1850
 Henry Brown, 1851–1855
 Richardson Graham, 1856–1861
 Thomas Green Clemson, Jr., 1861–1866
 William Frederick Halsey, 1866–1882
 George Alexander Keller, 1882–1902
 James Hart Lamb, D.D., 1902–1918
 William Cunningham Rodgers, D.D., 1919–1922
 Crosswell McBee, D.D., 1922–1945
 John Cecil Knewstub, 1945–1966
 Richard Walton Hess, 1967–1983
 Stephen Kent Jacobson, D.Min., 1984–1996
 W. Frank Allen, 1997–present

References
Citations

Sources

External links
 St. David’s Episcopal Church website
 "Old St. David's", a poem by Florence Earle Coates
 Video of the church and Longfellow’s poem: Henry Wadsworth Longfellow, Old St. David's at Radnor; read by Grover Gardner.  YouTube: West Production Services.
 Google Street View
 Old Saint David Church Cemetery at Find A Grave
 The St. David's Church (Radnor, Pa.) Records, spanning 300 years, are available for research use at the Historical Society of Pennsylvania.
 St. David's Church (Episcopal), Horse Shed, Valley Forge Road (Newtown Township), Wayne, Delaware County, PA: 1 photo and 1 photo caption page at Historic American Buildings Survey
 St. David's Church (Episcopal), Grave of General "Mad" Anthony Wayne, Valley Forge Road (Newtown Township), Wayne, Delaware County, PA: 1 photo, 2 data pages, and 1 photo caption page at Historic American Buildings Survey

1715 establishments in Pennsylvania
18th-century Episcopal church buildings
20th-century Episcopal church buildings
Cemeteries in Delaware County, Pennsylvania
Cemeteries on the National Register of Historic Places in Pennsylvania
Churches completed in 1715
Churches in Delaware County, Pennsylvania
Churches on the National Register of Historic Places in Pennsylvania
Episcopal churches in Pennsylvania
Historic American Buildings Survey in Pennsylvania
National Register of Historic Places in Delaware County, Pennsylvania
Radnor Township, Delaware County, Pennsylvania
Welsh-American culture in Pennsylvania